Zhu Lin defeated Lesia Tsurenko in the final, 6–4, 6–4 to win the women's singles tennis title at the 2023 Thailand Open. It was her first WTA Tour singles title.

Magda Linette was the reigning champion from 2020, when the event was last held, but withdrew before the tournament.

Seeds

Draw

Finals

Top half

Bottom half

Qualifying

Seeds

Qualifiers

Qualifying draw

First qualifier

Second qualifier

Third qualifier

Fourth qualifier

Fifth qualifier

Sixth qualifier

References

External links
 Main draw
 Qualifying draw

Thailand Open - Singles
 in women's tennis